James Arthur Murray (9 June 1880 – 29 October 1933) was a Scottish professional footballer who played in the Football League for Aston Villa and Small Heath. He played as a right-sided forward. He represented the Scottish Junior international team.

Murray was born in Benwhat, Dalmellington, Ayrshire. He played for St Augustine's and for Benwhat Heatherbell before joining Ayr in 1897. In March 1901 he moved to England and signed for the Football League champions Aston Villa; he played once in the 1900–01 season and once the following season before joining local rivals Small Heath in November 1901. Murray scored in his only competitive outing for Small Heath, in a losing cause against Sunderland in the First Division, and was described as "fairly fast, has capital command of the ball and can shoot excellently". Nevertheless, he moved to Southern League club Watford in 1902, and later appeared for Kettering and Wellingborough, also in the Southern League.

He died in Glasgow in 1933 at the age of 53.

References

1880 births
1933 deaths
Footballers from East Ayrshire
Scottish footballers
Association football forwards
Ayr F.C. players
Aston Villa F.C. players
Birmingham City F.C. players
Watford F.C. players
Kettering Town F.C. players
Wellingborough Town F.C. players
English Football League players
Southern Football League players